Aksiyon was a Turkish news magazine. The magazine was close to the Gülen movement. It was established by Feza Publications in 1994. In 2008 it was described by its Today's Zaman sister newspaper as "the most widely read Turkish weekly magazine" (its nearly 40,000 circulation accounted for over half the weekly news magazine market). Its circulation had increased from around 15,000 in 2001. It broke some major stories including (May 1996) a secret military agreement between Turkey and Israel; and comments by Major Şefik Soyuyüce admitting the use of students to create a crisis in preparation for the 1960 Turkish coup d'état.

Past editors of Aksiyon were İbrahim Karayeğen (2002–2004), Mehmet Yılmaz (2004–2008), Bülent Korucu (from 2008), and the last editor Idris Gursoy (2016). Contributors included  İdris Gürsoy and Zafer Özcan.

The magazine was a member of BPA Worldwide.

References

External links
 Official Site

1994 establishments in Turkey
2016 disestablishments in Turkey
Defunct political magazines published in Turkey
Companies formerly affiliated with the Gülen movement
magazines disestablished in 2016
magazines established in 1994
magazines published in Istanbul
mass media shut down in the 2016 Turkish purges
Turkish-language magazines
weekly news magazines published in Turkey
Banned magazines